Pasquale is a 1916 American comedy silent film directed by William Desmond Taylor and written by George Beban and Lawrence McCloskey. The film stars George Beban, Helen Jerome Eddy, Page Peters, Jack Nelson, Myrtle Stedman and Nigel De Brulier. The film was released on May 21, 1916, by Paramount Pictures.

Plot

Cast 
George Beban as Grocer
Helen Jerome Eddy as Margarita
Page Peters as Bob Fulton
Jack Nelson as Charlie Larkin
Myrtle Stedman as Banker's wife
Nigel De Brulier as Banker

Preservation status
This film is preserved in the Library of Congress collections.

References

External links 
 

1916 films
1910s English-language films
Silent American comedy films
1916 comedy films
Paramount Pictures films
Films directed by William Desmond Taylor
American black-and-white films
American silent feature films
1910s American films